Axiocerses heathi is a butterfly in the family Lycaenidae. It is found in north-western Zambia.

References

Butterflies described in 1996
Axiocerses
Endemic fauna of Zambia
Butterflies of Africa